The 1979–80 County Championship was the 38th season of the Liga IV, the fourth tier of the Romanian football league system. The champions of each county association play against one from a neighboring county in a play-off  to gain promotion to Divizia C.

Promotion play-off 
Teams promoted to Divizia C without a play-off matches as teams from less represented counties in the third division.

 (TR) Cetatea Turnu Măgurele
 (SJ) Rapid Jibou
 (VL) Hidroenergia Râmnicu Vâlcea
 (VS) FEPA 74 Bârlad

 (TL) Viitorul Mahmudia
 (BR) Tractorul Viziru
 (MH) Mecanizatorul Șimian
 (CV) Constructorul Sfântu Gheorghe

The matches was played on 6 and 13 July 1980.

County leagues

Arad County 
Seria A

Seria B

Championship final 
The matches was played on 4 and 8 June 1980.

Șoimii Lipova won the 1979–80 Arad County Championship and qualify for promotion play-off in Divizia C.

Harghita County 
 Series I

 Series II

Championship final 
The matches was played on 8 and 15 June 1980.

Unirea Cristuru Secuiesc won the 1979–80 Harghita County Championship and qualify for promotion play-off in Divizia C.

Hunedoara County

Maramureș County

Vâlcea County

See also 

 1979–80 Divizia A
 1979–80 Divizia B
 1979–80 Divizia C

References

External links
 

Liga IV seasons
4
Romania